Three ships of the United States Navy have been named Althea, after a shrub of the mallow family; the rose of sharon or a hollyhock.

  was a collier that served during the Civil War.
  was a tugboat that served during the Civil War.
  was a motorboat built in 1907.

Sources 
 

United States Navy ship names